The Departmental Council of Bouches-du-Rhône, sometimes abbreviated "CD 13" (in reference to Bouches-du-Rhône's INSEE and postal number), is the deliberative assembly of the French department of Bouches-du-Rhône. It consists of 58 members, known as departmental councillors, from 29 cantons. Its headquarters are in Marseille, the department's prefecture.

Fully renewed on 20 and 27 June 2021, the departmental council has been chaired since 2 April 2015 by Martine Vassal of The Republicans.

Composition

Executive

Presidents

Vice presidents 
The President of the Departmental Council is assisted by 15 vice presidents chosen from among the departmental councillors. Each of them has a delegation of authority.

Councillors' scarf 

The departmental councilors of Bouches-du-Rhône wear a tricolor: yellow, white and blue scarf. Unlike the scarf of parliamentarians and elected municipal officials, the wearing of the departmental scarf is not sanctioned by an official text.

Notes and references

Notes

References

See also 

 Bouches-du-Rhône
 Departmental council (France)

Bouches-du-Rhône
Bouches-du-Rhône